The 34th Infantry Division (34-ya Pekhotnaya Diviziya) was an infantry formation of the Russian Imperial Army.

Organization
The 13th Infantry Division was part of the 7th Army Corps.
1st Brigade
133rd Infantry Regiment
134th Infantry Regiment
2nd Brigade
135th Infantry Regiment
136th Infantry Regiment
34th Artillery Brigade

Commanders of the 1st Brigade
1905-1909 - Major general Nikita Batashev

Commanders of the 2nd Brigade
1905 - Major general Vasily Zholtanovsky
1909 - Major general Alexander Zhdanko

References

Infantry divisions of the Russian Empire
Military units and formations disestablished in 1918